Torridincola is a genus of beetles in the family Torridincolidae, containing these species:

 Torridincola congolesica Steffan, 1973
 Torridincola natalesica Steffan, 1973
 Torridincola rhodesica

References

Myxophaga genera